Leighton Barracks is a former military garrison, located on top of a hill in the Hubland area  east of the City of Würzburg, in Franconia, Germany.  It was active as a military base between 1936 and 2008, from 2012-onwards part of the barracks has converted to new role as additional academic buildings and student accommodation for the University of Würzburg.

History
The garrison's origins begin in 1936 when Fliegerhorst Würzburg was established for the Luftwaffe as an operational base.  It had an all-way grass landing/takeoff area where aircraft simply were directed into the wind for takeoffs and landings.  Its use during World War II is undetermined.

Würzburg and its airfield was captured by the United States Army in April 1945 as part of the Western Allied invasion of Germany.  The airfield was repaired by IX Engineering Command, Ninth Air Force into an Army Air Forces advanced Landing Ground, designated R-24.  IX Air Force Service Command units used the airfield as a casualty evacuation and combat resupply airfield. Fliegerhorst Würzburg was renamed Leighton Barracks on 17 June 1947, in honor of Captain John A. Leighton (HQ, EUCOM General Order #62, 17 June 1947). Leighton, commander of Company C, 10th Armored Infantry Battalion, 4th Armored Division, was killed in action near Raids, France, on 19 July 1944.

The former Luftwaffe/AAF airfield was reduced to a helipad, known as  Leighton Army Airfield (Heliport).  The garrison was closed in 2008 and returned to German control.

References

 Johnson, David C. (1988), U.S. Army Air Forces Continental Airfields (ETO), D-Day to V-E Day; Research Division, USAF Historical Research Center, Maxwell AFB, Alabama.

World War II airfields in Germany
Airports established in 1936
Airports in Bavaria
Würzburg